Juan Luis Hens Lorite (born 7 February 1984), commonly known as Juanlu, is a Spanish former professional footballer who played as a right midfielder.

Club career
Juanlu was born in Fuente Palmera, Province of Córdoba. After starting out at local Córdoba CF he moved to Valencia CF in January 2003, playing mostly for their reserves. On 23 January 2005, he appeared in the first of five competitive matches with the first team, against Villarreal CF: he came on as a substitute for Francisco Rufete in the seventh minute, being himself replaced at half-time by Marco Di Vaio in an eventual 3–1 La Liga away loss.

After a loan at UE Lleida, Juanlu was released and resumed his career also in the Segunda División, signing a two-year contract with CD Tenerife from Granada 74 CF in July 2008 and contributing four goals in 35 games in his second season as the club returned to the top flight after seven years.

Juanlu scored his first goal in the main tier on 13 December 2009, a consolation in the 2–1 defeat at Getafe CF; he totalled four for the campaign, in an immediate relegation. He was also part of the squad in 2010–11, as the side went down again.

Juanlu then spent four seasons in division two with Girona FC. He netted twice in the 2013 play-offs, but eventually failed to promote.

On 18 August 2015, the 31-year-old Juanlu joined third-tier FC Cartagena. In summer 2017, he moved to Mérida AD of the same league.

References

External links

1984 births
Living people
Sportspeople from the Province of Córdoba (Spain)
Spanish footballers
Footballers from Andalusia
Association football midfielders
La Liga players
Segunda División players
Segunda División B players
Tercera División players
Córdoba CF B players
Córdoba CF players
Valencia CF Mestalla footballers
Valencia CF players
UE Lleida players
Hércules CF players
Granada 74 CF footballers
CD Tenerife players
Girona FC players
FC Cartagena footballers
Mérida AD players
Spain youth international footballers